Baron Zsigmond Perényi de Perény (November 18, 1783 – October 24, 1849) was a Hungarian politician, who served as Speaker of the House of Magnates in 1849. After defeat of the Hungarian Revolution of 1848 he was executed because his name appeared in the Hungarian Declaration of Independence which was declared by the Diet of Hungary in Debrecen on April 14, 1849.

His grandson was Zsigmond Perényi, Speaker of the House of Magnates and Minister of the Interior.

References
 Jónás, Károly - Villám, Judit: A Magyar Országgyűlés elnökei 1848-2002. Argumentum, Budapest, 2002. pp. 187–190
 Fónagy, Zoltán: Perényi Zsigmond (Rubicon 1999/4)
 Fónagy, Zoltán: Perényi Zsigmond báró. In: Vértanúk könyve. A magyar forradalom és szabadságharc mártírjai 1848–1854. Rubicon könyvek. Bp. 2007. 265–268. oldal
 Doby, Antal: Báró Perényi Zsigmond, a magyar nemzet dicső vértanújának élete. Nagyszőllős, 1899.

1783 births
1849 deaths
People from Berehove
Hungarian nobility
Speakers of the House of Magnates
Executed politicians
Hungarian Revolution of 1848
Executed Hungarian people
People executed by the Austrian Empire
Members of the Hungarian Academy of Sciences
Zsigmond
19th-century executions by Austria
People from the Austrian Empire